The Pļaviņas–Gulbene Railway is a  long,  gauge railway built in 20th century beginning to connect Pļaviņas and Valka. The railway was originally part of a  narrow gauge railway, but was converted to the current gauge during World War I.

References 

Railway lines in Latvia
Railway lines opened in 1903
1900s establishments in Latvia
5 ft gauge railways in Latvia